Chris Denman (born October 7, 1983) is a former American football offensive lineman. He was drafted by the Tampa Bay Buccaneers in the seventh round of the 2007 NFL Draft. He played college football at Fresno State.

Denman has been a member of the Buffalo Bills and Florida Tuskers.

Early years
Denman attended Tehachapi High School in Tehachapi, California and was a student and a letterman in football. In football, he was a starter at both, tight end and defensive end. As a senior, he was an All-League honoree at both positions, and an All-Area selection. Chris Denman graduated from Tehachapi High School in 2002.

College career
Denman played college football at Fresno State.

Professional career

Tampa Bay Buccaneers
Denman was selected in the seventh round of the 2007 NFL Draft by the Tampa Bay Buccaneers. After spending his rookie season on injured reserve, he was released by the Buccaneers on August 30, 2008 during final cuts.

Buffalo Bills
Denman was signed to the practice squad of the Buffalo Bills on September 8, 2008. He was released on November 12 when the team re-signed cornerback Dustin Fox to the practice squad. The Bills re-signed him to the practice squad on November 19.

After finishing the 2008 season on the Bills' practice squad, Denman was re-signed to a future contract on December 30, 2008. He was waived on September 1.

External links
Buffalo Bills bio
Fresno State Bulldogs bio
Tampa Bay Buccaneers bio

1983 births
Living people
People from Kern County, California
Players of American football from California
American football offensive tackles
American football offensive guards
Fresno State Bulldogs football players
Tampa Bay Buccaneers players
Buffalo Bills players
Florida Tuskers players